Seemannia is a New World genus in the flowering plant family Gesneriaceae. There are four species in the genus, primarily found in the Andean regions of South America. The name honors the German botanist Berthold Carl Seemann.

Taxonomic history
Seemannia was created in 1855 by Regel for the species Seemannia ternifolia (now considered a synonym of S. sylvatica).  In 1976 Seemannia was synonymized under the genus Gloxinia by gesneriad specialist Hans Wiehler but has more recently been revived following phylogenetic and morphological research on relationships of Gloxinia and related genera, which suggested that Wiehler's generic concept of Gloxinia was overly broad and polyphyletic. Although now recognized as a separate genus, Seemannia is closely related to Gloxinia and hybrids between the two genera are fertile although the two genera are very distinct morphologically.

Although all of the species occur in the Andes, Seemannia purpurascens is unusual in having a disjunct distribution, with populations in northern South America (Guyana, French Guiana, and northern Brazil) widely separated from Andean populations in southern Peru and Bolivia.

Species
 Seemannia gymnostoma (southern Peru, Bolivia, northern Argentina)
 Seemannia nematanthodes (Bolivia, northern Argentina)
 Seemannia purpurascens (southern Peru, Bolivia, Guyana, French Guiana, northern Brazil)
 Seemannia sylvatica (Peru, Bolivia, northern Argentina, Paraguay, southern Brazil)

References

Roalson, E.H., J.K. Boggan, L.E., Skog, & E.A. Zimmer. 2005. Untangling the Gloxinieae (Gesneriaceae). I. Phylogenetic patterns and generic boundaries inferred from nuclear, chloroplast, and morphological cladistic data sets. Taxon 54 (2): 389-410.
Roalson, E.H., J.K. Boggan & L.E. Skog. 2005. Reorganization of tribal and generic boundaries in the Gloxinieae (Gesneriaceae: Gesnerioideae) and the description of a new tribe in the Gesnerioideae, Sphaerorrhizeae. Selbyana 25 (2): 225-238.
Wiehler, H. 1976. A report on the classification of Achimenes, Eucodonia, Gloxinia, and Anetanthus (Gesneriaceae). Selbyana 1 (4): 374-404.

External links
Seemannia at Genera of Gesneriaceae

Gesnerioideae
Gesneriaceae genera
Taxa named by Eduard August von Regel